St. Johns County is a county in the northeastern part of the U.S. state of Florida. As of the 2020 United States Census, its population was 273,425. The county seat and largest incorporated city is St. Augustine. St. Johns County is part of the Jacksonville metropolitan area.

The county was established in 1821. It is one of the two original counties established after Florida was ceded to the United States, at the start of the Florida Territorial period, and corresponded roughly to the former colonial province of East Florida. It was named for the St. Johns River, which runs along its western border.

Today, St. Johns County primarily comprises residential bedroom communities for those who commute to Jacksonville. Tourism, primarily associated with St. Augustine and the many golf courses in the area, is the chief economic industry.

There is also an unincorporated community named Saint Johns in northwestern St. Johns County.

History
St. Johns County's history begins in 1821, when Colonel Robert Butler received Spanish East Florida from Captain-General Colonel José M. Coppinger. Butler represented Major General Andrew Jackson, federal military commissioner for the Florida provinces (las Floridas) with the powers of governor, exercising the powers of the Captain General and the Intendants of the Island of Cuba and the governors of the said provinces, respectively, who ordained that all the country east of the river Suwannee should be designated the County of St. Johns.

St. Johns was established, along with Escambia County (in the former West Florida province), on July 21, 1821, 11 days after Butler received Florida for the United States, and five days after the city of St. Augustine was incorporated.

The name Saint John's was derived from the Spanish mission (c. 1580) San Juan del Puerto ("Saint John of the Harbor"). The U.S. Department of the Interior dropped the apostrophe in 1932 because an apostrophe implied ownership.

It was a huge county, encompassing most of peninsular Florida, more than 39,000 square miles; it was 475 miles long by 165 miles wide. Much of the land was uninhabited. Saint Augustine (1565) was the oldest permanent European settlement, and there were Native Americans in the county as well.

Coat of Arms 
As described in Certification of the Coat of Arms:

In a field of green an Agnus Dei of silver, suspended on the dexter [*left side of the drawing] side of the Agnus Dei is a silver banner with red cross (as a direct allusion and symbol of the name of the County). On a heraldic chief of red is a gold castle with towers, with masonry joints in black, and with the windows and doors in red (in recognition of the fortress that was constructed in the military garrison of St. Augustine which is a part of the County).

An overall border is composed of eight parts; alternating, a red quadrilateral, with a gold castle and quadrilateral of silver with a purple lion rampant (that is to say, alternating the simplified Arms of Castille and Leon). 

Given for a crest is a mural crown of a province. This is a circle of gold walls with in reality twelve gold towers with all the masonry joints in black. Only seven of the towers are visible in the drawing.

Geography

Adjacent counties
 Duval County, Florida – north
 Flagler County, Florida – south
 Putnam County, Florida – southwest
 Clay County, Florida – west

National protected areas
 Castillo de San Marcos National Monument
 Fort Matanzas National Monument
 Guana Tolomato Matanzas National Estuarine Research Reserve

Demographics

As of the 2020 United States census, there were 273,425 people, 91,253 households, and 67,548 families residing in the county.

As of the census of 2000, there were 123,135 people, 49,614 households, and 34,084 families residing in the county. The racial makeup of the county was 90.92% White, 6.29% African American, 0.26% American Indian, 0.95% Asian, 0.05% Pacific Islander, 0.55% from other races, and 0.97% from two or more races. Hispanic or Latino of any race were 15.8% of the population.

There were 49,614 households, of which 29.2% had children under age 18 living with them, 56.8% were married couples living together, 8.9% had a female householder with no husband present, and 31.3% were non-families. 24.3% of all households were made up of individuals, and 9.4% had someone living alone who was 65 or older. The average household size was 2.44 and the average family size was 2.90.

The age of the population was spread out, with 23.1% under 18, 7.0% from 18 to 24, 27.6% from 25 to 44, 26.4% from 45 to 64, and 15.9% who were 65 or older. The median age was 41. For every 100 females there were 94.5 males. For every 100 females 18 and older, there were 91.5 males.

The median household income was $50,099, and the median family income was $59,153. Males had a median income of $40,783 versus $27,240 for females. The per capita income was $28,674. About 5.1% of families and 8.0% of the population were below the poverty line, including 9.3% of those under 18 and 6.2% of those 65 or older.

Government

The St. Johns County Board of County Commissioners is an elected five-member commission, which appoints a county administrator. The main environmental and agricultural body is the St. Johns County Soil and Water Conservation District, which works closely with other area agencies.

St. Johns County Animal Control operates the St. Johns County Pet Adoption and Holding Center at 130 North Stratton Road.

Voter registration
According to the Secretary of State's office, Republicans are a majority of registered voters in St. Johns County.

Education

Primary and secondary education
Public schools are run by the St. Johns County School District, headed by the St. Johns County School Board, an elected five-member board which appoints a superintendent to administer school operations. The system has grown considerably since 2000 to accommodate the county's rapid population growth. It is Florida's top-performing school district in Florida Comprehensive Assessment Test scores, the state's standardized test for public schools. The district also received the 2011 Energy Star Top Performer and Leader from the EPA.

For the 2014–15 school year the district comprised:
 18 elementary schools (K–5)
 3 K-8 school (K–8)
 7 middle schools (6–8)
 7 high schools (9–12)
 1 alternative center (K-12)
 6 charter schools (including a vocational-technical college)
 1 virtual school

The St. Johns County School District has a robust special education department serving the needs of students with autism, cerebral palsy, and cognitive disabilities. The Florida School for the Deaf and Blind is a residential school for deaf and blind students, funded and operated by the state of Florida. The Catholic Diocese of St. Augustine operates St. Joseph Academy, a private high school in St. Augustine.

St. Johns County schools have received a state government grade of "A" for their work with the students and FCAT grading from 2004 to 2014.

Higher education
St. Johns River State College, a state college in the Florida College System, has a campus in St. Johns County near St. Augustine. It is accredited by the Southern Association of Colleges and Schools to award associates degrees and two bachelor's degrees.

Flagler College is a private liberal arts institution in downtown St. Augustine. U.S. News & World Report has recognized it as a "Best Value College".

University of St. Augustine for Health Sciences is a school for physical and occupational therapy education.

Libraries
The St. Johns County Public Library System has six branches:
 Anastasia Island Branch
 Bartram Trail Branch
 Hastings Branch
 Main Library
 Ponte Vedra Beach Branch
 Southeast Branch

St. Augustine Historical Society
 Research Library

Communities

Cities
 St. Augustine
 St. Augustine Beach

Census-designated places

 Butler Beach
 Crescent Beach
 Flagler Estates
 Fruit Cove
 Nocatee
 Palm Valley
 Sawgrass
 St. Augustine Shores
 St. Augustine South
 Villano Beach
 World Golf Village

Other unincorporated communities

 Bakersville
 Elkton
 Hastings
 Julington Creek Plantation
 Mill Creek
 Ponte Vedra Beach
 St. Johns
 Spuds
 Summer Haven
 Switzerland
 Vermont Heights

Transportation

Airports
 Northeast Florida Regional Airport
 Jacksonville International Airport (JAX) is about 35 miles to the north (in Duval County).

Highways

 

 Dixie Highway

See also
 National Register of Historic Places listings in St. Johns County, Florida
 Parks in St. Augustine/St. Johns County, Florida
 St. Johns River

Notes

References

External links

 
Saint Johns County
1821 establishments in Florida Territory
Populated places established in 1821
Counties in the Jacksonville metropolitan area
North Florida